Osk(c)ar Ewald, born Oskar Friedländer, or Friedländer Oszkár (11 November 1881, Búrszentgyörgy/Sankt Georgen, Hungary (now Borský Svätý Jur, Senica District, Slovakia) – 25 September 1940, near Oxford, Oxfordshire) was a Hungarian-Austrian philosopher.  His father was Moritz Friedländer, a liberal scholar of Judaism who worked with the Jewish community of the Kingdom of Hungary on matters including the expansion of education.  Oskar himself would convert to Protestantism and change his last name to Ewald.

Literary works
 Nietzsches Lehre in ihren Grundbegriffen, 1903
 Gründe und Abgründe, 1909
 Die Erweckung, 1922
 Freidenkertum und Religion, 1920

External links
 

1881 births
1940 deaths
Austrian Jews
Hungarian Jews
Jewish philosophers
Converts to Protestantism from Judaism
Dachau concentration camp survivors
People from Senica District
20th-century Austrian philosophers
20th-century Hungarian philosophers